Kim or Kimberley Smith may refer to:

Sports
Kim Smith (runner) (born 1981), New Zealand distance runner
Kim Smith (basketball) (Kim Smith Gaucher, born 1984), Canadian female professional basketball player
Kimberly Smith (cyclist) (born 1968), American cyclist
Kim Smith (footballer) (1952–2009), Australian rules player
Kimberley Smith (netball) (born 1982), Australian netball player
Kimberly Smith (rugby union) (born 1985)

Others
Kim David Smith (born 1982/83), Australian cabaret performer in New York City
Kimberly G. Smith (1948–2018), American biologist
Kim Gruenenfelder Smith, American author
Kimberly K. Smith (born 1966), American historian and political science professor
Kim Smith (model) (born 1983), American actress and fashion model
Kim Walker-Smith (born 1981), American singer and songwriter
Birth name of Kim Wilde British singer
Kim Smith (Reality TV), contestant on The Amazing Race
Kim Smith (EastEnders), fictional character on TV soap opera EastEnders